The Ohio Virtual Academy (OHVA) is one of many virtual charter schools that is powered by the curriculum provider Stride Inc. The academy, like most Stride-supplied schools, provides the student with textbooks, materials, and a loaned computer, so the student can access their online lessons.

Curriculum
The course lessons and lessons are on the K12 Online School (OLS) here parents are allowed to customize their student's school calendar and add/remove course lessons from the daily plan and add/remove vacation days. However the student must have completed each core course (Math, English, Science, and Social Studies) to 90% or higher by the first Friday of June and have had at least 920 hours logged. Course lessons include online reading followed by offline textbook work and then the lesson test, also called an assessment. The test consists of an online multiple choice quiz and/or a textbook quiz that has multiple choice and/or short answer. The offline textbook multiple choice and/or short answer questions are answered by the student, the answers are then graded with the teacher guide answer key book by the parent who enters the results into the online test. The online questions are then graded by the computer and the test grade is then displayed. At the end of the school day the parent records attendance on the OLS of what courses their student worked on that day and how much time they spent.

Notable alumni 

 Leelah Alcorn, transgender girl who committed suicide in 2014
 Anthony De La Torre, actor and singer
 Isabela Merced, actress and singer

Criticism
Criticisms have been levelled against this schooling approach due to poor test scores.

See also
 K12 Inc.
 Wisconsin Virtual Academy

References

Sources
 Lawriter - ORC - 3314.041 Distributing statement concerning state-prescribed testing and compulsory attendance law to parents.

Online schools in the United States
Public high schools in Ohio
Public middle schools in Ohio
Public elementary schools in Ohio
Charter schools in Ohio
Online K–12 schools